Justin Smiley (born November 11, 1981 in Ellabell, Georgia) is a former American football guard. He was originally drafted by the San Francisco 49ers in the second round of the 2004 NFL Draft. He played college football at Alabama.

He was a member of the Miami Dolphins, Jacksonville Jaguars, and Oakland Raiders.

Professional career
He started his professional career on the San Francisco 49ers. Being drafted 2nd round in the 2004 NFL Draft he played with the Niners Until the end of the 2007 NFL season. On February 29, 2008, he was the first player of the 2008 offseason to sign with another team as an unrestricted free agent. He signed a five-year, $25 million contract with $9 million guaranteed with the Miami Dolphins. He was traded to the Jaguars on May 24, 2010.

On July 28, 2011, Smiley was released by the Jacksonville Jaguars. Smiley signed with the Oakland Raiders on August 2. He announced his retirement on August 6.

Coaching career
On September 18, 2011, Smiley returned to Alabama as a coach. Smiley has since decided against coaching.

Personal life.

Smiley worked for the Federal Bureau of Prisons at FCI Aliceville, Alabama, but has since resigned.

References

External links
San Francisco 49ers bio
Miami Dolphins bio

1981 births
Living people
American football offensive guards
Alabama Crimson Tide football players
San Francisco 49ers players
Miami Dolphins players
People from Bryan County, Georgia
Jacksonville Jaguars players
Oakland Raiders players
Ed Block Courage Award recipients